The 1998–99 season was the 104th season in the history of Plymouth Argyle Football Club, their 74th in the Football League,

Players

First-team squad
Squad at end of season

Left club during season

Third Division

Final standings

Results by round

Matches

Football League Trophy

Matches

Football League Cup

Matches

FA Cup

Matches

Notes

References

Plymouth Argyle F.C. seasons
Plymouth Argyle